Henry of Atholl, the son of Maol Choluim (Gd: Eanraig mac Mhaoil Chaluim), was Mormaer of Atholl, Scotland, from sometime in the 1190s until his death in 1211. Henry had no sons, but did have at least two daughters—Isabella and Forbhlaith. Before he died, Henry married off Isabella to Thomas, brother of the second-most important man in Scotland, Alan, Lord of Galloway. Henry also married off Forbhlaith to Sir David de Hastings.

Bibliography
 Anderson, Alan Orr, Early Sources of Scottish History: AD 500-1286, Vol. II, (Edinburgh, 1922), p. 478, n. 8
 Roberts, John L., Lost Kingdoms: Celtic Scotland in the Middle Ages, (Edinburgh, 1997), pp. 54–5

12th-century births
1211 deaths
People from Perth and Kinross
Mormaers of Atholl
12th-century mormaers
13th-century mormaers